Martin Rittsel (born 28 March 1971 in Växjö) is a former Swedish cyclist.

Major results

1989
1st  Junior National Time Trial Championships
1995
1st Stage 4 Peace Race
2nd National Time Trial Championships
1996
1st Stage 4 Settimana Internazionale di Coppi e Bartali
3rd National Time Trial Championships
1997
1st Overall Cinturón a Mallorca
1st Stage 4b
1998
1st  National Road Race Championships
1999
1st Stage 3b Bayern-Rundfahrt
1st Overall Vuelta a Argentina
2nd Overall Sachsen Tour
1st Prologue
2nd Overall Niedersachsen-Rundfahrt
3rd Overall Tour of Sweden
3rd Grand Prix de la Ville de Lillers
2000
1st Overall Four Days of Dunkirk
2nd Overall Tour de Picardie
7th Overall Paris–Nice
2002
3rd National Time Trial Championships

References

1971 births
Living people
Swedish male cyclists
Cyclists at the 2000 Summer Olympics
Olympic cyclists of Sweden
People from Växjö
Sportspeople from Kronoberg County
20th-century Swedish people
21st-century Swedish people